is a Japanese women's rights activist. She pursued legal action for enforcement of Japan's Equal Opportunities law and obtained recognition from the government that maternal harassment is illegal. She was a 2015 winner of the US State Department's International Women of Courage Award.

Biography
Sayaka Osakabe was born in Japan in 1978. She was working as a magazine editor when she became pregnant. Rather than approve shorter working hours, her boss tried to pressure her to quit her job. After suffering two miscarriages, Osakabe asked for approved leave of absence should she become pregnant again and was denied. Osakabe quit her job under duress and pursued her case with a labor tribunal. In June, 2014, she won her case and formed a support group called Matahara Net, using a portmandeau of the English words "maternity and harassment" to create the name, which has now become a legal term.

As of 2019, the World Economic Forum ranks Japan 121st in the world in workplace equality and official labor statistics show one in four working women have experienced maternity harassment. Though Japanese law guarantees women the right to seek less physically demanding roles during pregnancy and allows 14 weeks of maternity leave or parental leave, for either parent, in conjunction with childbirth, many women fail to utilize the guarantees due to perceived job insecurity.

On 18 September 2014 Matahara members attended a trial at the Supreme Court in support of another woman undergoing a similar situation. The woman was demoted by her hospital employer during her pregnancy. A lower court ruling found that it was "in the scope of the hospital authority over personnel issues to remove her from her supervisory position," but Japan's Equal Employment Opportunity Law specifically bans demotion due to pregnancy. In a landmark ruling issued 23 October 2014, the Supreme Court of Japan overturned the lower court verdicts and ruled that demotion or other punitive measures based on pregnancy violate the Equal Employment Opportunity Law.

Osakabe continues her efforts with Matahara Net promoting the empowerment of women. Her goal is to change public policy and social perception so that all women, rather than an elite few, will have equal work opportunities.

Thanks to Osakabe's actions and commitment, maternal harassment has been punishable by law in Japan since 2017.

References

External links
 Matahara Net website

Living people
1978 births
Japanese women's rights activists
Japanese feminists
Recipients of the International Women of Courage Award